Kevin Smith (born July 25, 1969) is a former tight end in the National Football League. Smith spent three seasons with the Los Angeles Raiders. After a year away from the NFL, he joined the Green Bay Packers for the 1996 NFL season. As such, he was a member of the Super Bowl XXXI Champion Packers.

He played at the collegiate level at the University of California, Los Angeles and attended Skyline High School in Oakland, California.

See also
List of Green Bay Packers players

References

1969 births
Living people
American football tight ends
UCLA Bruins football players
Green Bay Packers players
Los Angeles Raiders players